The Security Building is an 11-story high-rise building located at 510 South Spring Street within the Spring Street Financial District in Downtown Los Angeles, California. It has been converted to the  residential Lofts at the Security Building.

It was the former headquarters office building of Security First National Bank, completed in 1906. The building was the tallest building in the city for four years when completed.

Landmark
The Security Building is a Los Angeles Historic-Cultural Monument, and is a Historic district contributing property to the Spring Street Financial District, listed on the National Register of Historic Places.

See also
 Spring Street Financial District
 List of Los Angeles Historic-Cultural Monuments in Downtown Los Angeles
 National Register of Historic Places listings in Los Angeles, California

References

External links
 Lofts at The Security Building — Simpson Property Group.

Buildings and structures in Downtown Los Angeles
Residential skyscrapers in Los Angeles
Los Angeles Historic-Cultural Monuments
Historic district contributing properties in California
National Register of Historic Places in Los Angeles
Bank buildings on the National Register of Historic Places in California
1906 establishments in California
Office buildings completed in 1906
Chicago school architecture in California